Laurence James Mooney (5 May 1923 – 3 January 2007) was an Australian politician.

He was born in Ararat, Victoria. In 1976 he was elected to the Tasmanian House of Assembly as a Liberal member for Bass. He was defeated at the following election in 1979. He died in Low Head.

References

1923 births
2007 deaths
Liberal Party of Australia members of the Parliament of Tasmania
Members of the Tasmanian House of Assembly
People from Ararat, Victoria
20th-century Australian politicians